The 2007 Canadian Tour season ran from April to September and consisted of 14 tournaments. It was the 38th season of the Canadian Professional Golf Tour.

The season started with two events in the United States (in April), followed by four events in Mexico (in April and May), and finishing with eight events in Canada (in June through September). American Byron Smith won the Order of Merit.

Schedule
The following table lists official events during the 2007 season.

References

External links
Official site

Canadian Tour
PGA Tour Canada